"Good Excuse" is a promotional-only release by the Australian jam band, The John Butler Trio, from their fourth studio album Grand National.

"Good Excuse" was released in March 2007 in Australia by Jarrah Records and in the United States by Atlantic Records.
 
Butler describes the song as a "wake-up call to our self-obsessed consumerist society".

Awards 
"Good Excuse" won 'Blues & Roots Work of the Year' at the 2008 Australasian Performing Right Association Awards.

Video 
The video for the song was directed by James Hackett and Jean Camden (Hackett Films) and features a combination of 2D and 3D animation together with live action. The video was nominated 'Most Popular Music Video' at the 2008 West Australian Music Industry Awards.

Track listing 
Written by John Butler

Personnel

John Butler Trio 
 John Butler — vocals, acoustic/amplified 6 string guitar, harmonica
 Shannon Birchall — double bass, backing vocals
 Michael Barker — drums, congas, shaker, tambourine, cow bells, vibraslap, backing vocals

Additional musicians 
 Michael Caruana — piano, B3 Hammond

Production credits 
 John Butler — producer
 Mario Caldato Jr. — producer, engineer, mixing
 Shannon Birchall — co-producer
 Michael Barker — co-producer
 Jarrad Hearman — assistant engineer
 Bernie Grundman — mastering
 Tom Walker — artwork

References

External links 
 Video clip for "Good Excuse"

2007 singles
2007 songs
APRA Award winners
Atlantic Records singles
John Butler Trio songs
Songs written by John Butler (musician)
Song recordings produced by Mario Caldato Jr.